The chestnut-bellied tit (Sittiparus castaneoventris) is a small passerine bird in the tit family Paridae that is endemic to Taiwan.

The chestnut-bellied tit was first described by the English ornithologist John Gould in 1863 and given the binomial name Parus castaneoventris. It was formerly considered as a subspecies of the varied tit but was promoted to species status after the publication of a phylogenetic study in 2014.

The species differs from the varied tit in having underparts of a deep chestnut colour.

References

External links
 Birding In Taiwan: Endemic subspecies of Taiwan birds - first impressions

chestnut-bellied tit
Endemic birds of Taiwan
chestnut-bellied tit